Bernard Richard (born 30 August 1957) is a former French racing cyclist. He rode in 1988 and 1989 editions of both the Tour de France and the Vuelta a España.

References

External links
 

1957 births
Living people
French male cyclists
Sportspeople from Mayenne
Cyclists from Pays de la Loire